Laxman Maruti Gaikwad (born July 23, 1952, Dhanegaon, Latur District, Maharashtra) is a famous Marathi  novelist known for his best work The Branded, a translation of his autobiographical novel Uchalaya (also known as Ucalaya). This novel not only gave him international recognition but he was also awarded the Maharashtra Gourav Puraskar, and the Sahitya Akademi award for this novel. Considered a masterpiece in Marathi literature, his novel for the first time brings to the world of literature the trials and tribulations of his tribe, Uchalya, literally the pilferers, a term coined by the British who classified the tribe as a criminal tribe. This book also brings in the problems faced by the Dalits in India. At present he is residing in Mumbai.

Other notable novels written by him include Dubang, Chini Mathachi Divas, Samaj Sahitya Ani Swathantra, Wadar Vedna, Vakila Pardhi, Utav and A Swathantra Konasat.

Social services
Gaikwad has been associated with social services for a long time. Since 1986, he was the president of the Jankalyan Vikas Sanstha and since 1990, he has been the president of the Denotified and Nomadic Tribes Organization, an organization associated with the welfare of Tribes. He has actively participated in the Labor Movement and worked for the welfare of the farmers, slum-dwellers and the other weaker-sections of the society.

Books published                                                                                                                          
Uchalya                                       
He Swatantrey konasati                                                
Chini Matitil Divas                                  
Samaj Sahitya Ani Swatantrey      
Vakilya Pardhi                                         
Wadar Vedna
Buddhachi Vippassanna                        
Dhubang
Dr. B.R. Ambedkaranchi Jivan Ani karya         
Utav   
Gav Kusa Baheril Mansa

Awards and honors
Gaikwad has won many awards. They are:
 
International awards
SAARC Literary Award, 2001 by President of India

Government awards
Youngest Sahitya Academy Award winner in 1988
Maharashtra Gourav Puraskar in 1990.
Best writer award from Government of Maharashtra in 2003

Other awards
Pimpri Chinchwad Mahanagar Palika Award
Pune Mahanagar Palika Award
Gourav Sanman Puraskar from Nashik Municipality Corporation
Maharashtra Kamgar  Kalyan Mandal Sanman Puraskar
Sahitya Ratna Anna Bhau Sathe Puraskar
Gourav Sanman Puraskar from Bahujan Karmachari 
Maharashtra Foundation Puraskar for the best writer
Gunther Sontheimer Memorial Award
Samata Award
Sanjivini Puraskar
Panghanti Award
Mukadam Award
Galib Ratna Puraskar, Mumbai
Dr. Babasaheb Ambedkar Puraskar

Honors
Title of Stalwarts Limca Book of Records
Many books are referred for studies in many universities and schools in India by students
Drama Act was performed on Uchalya at National level
Documentary film has been prepared by Govt. of India on Uchalya

Earlier government membership (ex-member)
State and Central Government Literature Department Member
National Human Rights Commission Member
Sahitya Academy Convener
State Backward Class Commission Member

References

Marathi-language literature
Marathi people
Marathi-language writers
1956 births
Living people
Recipients of the Sahitya Akademi Award in Marathi